John Shavliani, was the noble and founder of House of Shavliani, presumably of Svan origin and King of Abkhazia between 871 and 873.

Life 
King George I of Abkhazia died without a male heir, however there were still other members of the royal family that the two sons of his brother, Demetrius II: The oldest, Tinen of Tchikha and the youngest, Bagrat (then Bagrat I of Abkhazia) that was exiled to Constantinople. The representatives of the Shavliani aristocratic family, who had a deal with the Queen, the widow of George I, put to death Tinen, while Bagrat was "thrown into the sea", the latter was survived and fled to Constantinople. As a result, John usurped the power in the kingdom but died after less than two years of reign and his son Adarnase succeeded him.

Notes

Bibliography 
 Marie-Félicité Brosset, Histoire de la Géorgie.
Nodar Assatiani i Alexandre Bendianachvili, Histoire de la Géorgie, Paris, l'Harmattan, 1997, 335 pàgs..

John